Cehei Pond Nature Reserve is situated in north-western Romania, in Crasna river floodplain, in Sălaj County and is a protected area with aquatic vegetation and fauna specific to such area.

Fauna 
Birds: little bittern (Ixobrychus minutus), mallard (Anas platyrhinchos), great reed warbler (Acrocephalus arundinaceus), white stork (Ciconia ciconia), common moorhen (Gallinula chloropus);

Frogs: yellow-bellied toad (Bombina veriegata), European fire-bellied toad (Bombina bomina);

Reptiles:  European green lizard (Lacerta viridis)

Flora 

The Cehei Pond represents a very favorable place for the development of highly diverse flora, with numerous rare species.

Tree species: grey willow (Salix cinerea), black alder (Alnus glutinosa), goat willow (Salix caprea);

Species of grass: Hydrocharis (Hydrocharis morsus-ranae), Scutellaria galericulata (Scutellaria galericulata var. epilobiifolia), Ranunculus sceleratus (Ranunculus sceleratus L.), Utricularia vulgaris (Utricularia vulgaris L.), Phragmites (Phragmites australis), Typha (Typha latifolia), Utricularia vulgaris (Utricularia vulgaris L.).

See also 
 Lapiș Forest

References

External links 
 Cehei Pond Natural Reserve

Image gallery 

Protected areas of Romania
Geography of Sălaj County
Protected areas established in 2000
Tourist attractions in Sălaj County
Șimleu Silvaniei
Ponds of Europe